The Lawless is a 1950 American film noir directed by Joseph Losey and features Macdonald Carey, Gail Russell and Johnny Sands.

A newspaper editor in California becomes concerned about the plight of the state's fruit pickers, mostly immigrants from Mexico. Film critic Thom Andersen identified The Lawless as one example of film gris, a more cynical variety of film noir with leftist themes. The film was also released as The Dividing Line.

Plot
California fruit picker Paul Rodriguez hopes to someday have a farm of his own. When his friend Lopo Chavez has a car accident, he is insulted with a racial slur by Joe Ferguson, a passenger in the other car.

Joe's father disapproves of this bigotry. Lopo visits his friend Sunny Garcia, whose family publishes a Spanish-language paper called La Luz.

At a dance, Sunny is introduced to Larry Wilder, editor of "The Union", who once was a big-city newspaper reporter. A racially heated fight breaks out at the dance. Paul accidentally strikes Peters, a policeman. Joe is also arrested. A reporter who works for Larry depicts the incident to a Stockton paper as a full-scale race riot. Reporter Jan Dawson arrives to pursue the story.

Peters roughs up Paul in the back seat of the police car. His partner tries to intervene but crashes the car and dies. Paul flees. A dragnet for him begins. It intensifies when a teenage farm girl, Mildred, startled at seeing Paul, falls and is knocked unconscious, after which she blames Paul for what happened.

Larry tries to defend Paul in a newspaper article, inciting more anger. Lopo is attacked and a lynch mob for Paul is organized. The newspaper office is destroyed. Larry considers leaving town for good, but he is in love with Sunny, so they decide to merge their newspapers and continue to fight for what's right.

Cast
 Macdonald Carey as Larry Wilder
 Gail Russell as Sunny Garcia
 Johnny Sands as Joe Ferguson
 Lee Patrick as Jan Dawson
 John Hoyt as Ed Ferguson
 Lalo Rios as Paul Rodriguez
Maurice Jara as Lopo Chavez
 Walter Reed as Jim Wilson
 Guy Anderson as Jonas Creel
 Argentina Brunetti as Mrs Rodriguez
 William Edmunds as Mr. Jensen
 Gloria Winters as Mildred Jensen
John Davis as Harry Pawling
 Martha Hyer as Caroline Tyler
 Frank Fenton as Mr Prentiss
 Paul Harvey as Chief of Police Blake
Felipe Turich as Mr. Rodriguez
Ian MacDonald as Al Peters
Noel Reyburn as Fred Jackson
 Tab Hunter as Frank O'Brien (Hunter's film debut)
Russ Conway as Eldredge
Robert Williams as Boswell
James Bush as Anderson
Julia Faye as Mrs. Jensen

Production
The film was known as Outrage. Gail Russell had been on suspension by Paramount but got off it to make this film.

The film was an attempt by Pine-Thomas Productions to make a more "significant" kind of film. Shooting took 18 days. Pine Thomas said they expected to make a profit of $1 million on the film.

Reception

Critical response
Film critic Bosley Crowther praised the film.  He wrote, "Within the inevitable limits of the low-budget action film, which happens to be the type of product that these modest gentlemen produce, they have made an exciting picture on a good, solid, social theme—the cruelty of a community when inflamed by prejudice. And although their drama, The Lawless, is no Fury or Intruder in the Dust, it is a startling account of mob violence in a northern California town. With merited optimism, it was presented at the Astor yesterday."

The staff at Variety magazine also gave the film a positive review.  They wrote, "Racial tolerance gets a working over in The Lawless, but the producers don’t soapbox the message, using it, instead, as a peg on which to produce a hard-hitting drama, equipped with action and fast pace ... Performances all stack up as topnotch, with several being standout."

References

External links
 
 
 
 
 The Lawless information site and DVD review at DVD Beaver (includes images)
  ("Race & Hollywood: Latino Images in Film") on Turner Classic Movies

1950 films
1950 drama films
American political drama films
American black-and-white films
1950s English-language films
Film noir
Films based on American novels
Films directed by Joseph Losey
Paramount Pictures films
1950s political drama films
1950s American films